Caririsuchus is an extinct genus of peirosaurid crocodylomorph. Fossils have been found from the Romualdo Formation of the Santana Group in the Araripe Basin in northeastern Brazil, dating back to the Albian stage of the Early Cretaceous.

References 

Albian life
Early Cretaceous crocodylomorphs of South America
Cretaceous Brazil
Fossils of Brazil
Romualdo Formation
Fossil taxa described in 1987
Taxa named by Alexander Kellner
Prehistoric pseudosuchian genera